Blanche of Navarre (c. 1331 – 5 October 1398), was a French princess and Infanta of Navarre as a member of the House of Évreux (a cadet branch of the House of Capet) and by marriage Queen of France from 29 January until 22 August 1350.

Blanche d'Évreux was intended to become the bride of John, Duke of Normandy, heir of the throne of France — whose first wife had just died of the Black Death— but eventually married his father, King Philip VI of France. Only a few months after their wedding, the French king died prematurely and Blanche found herself a widow.

After giving birth in 1351 to a posthumous daughter, Blanche refused to remarry King Peter of Castile and retired to the large dower lands that were granted by her late husband. Despite her widowhood, she played an essential role in 1354 by attempting to reconcile her brother King Charles II of Navarre with King John II of France. In 1389, she organized the coronation of Isabeau of Bavaria, the wife of King Charles VI of France.

Life
Born around 1331, Blanche was the third daughter of King Philip III and Queen Joan II of Navarre; by both her paternal and maternal ancestry, she belonged to the House of Capet.

Blanche was engaged on 19 August 1335 to Andrew, only son and heir of the Dauphin Humbert II of Viennois, but the project was abandoned after the premature death of her fiancé two months later. Then, on 15 March 1340, a marriage contract was signed between Blanche and Louis of Male, only son and heir of Louis I, Count of Flanders, which provided for payment of a dowry of 50,000 livres for the Infanta of Navarre. The engagement was nullified on 6 June 1347 by the marriage of Louis of Male to Margaret, daughter of John III, Duke of Brabant. Finally, on 1 July 1345, while still officially engaged with the heir of Flanders, a marriage contract was drawn up between Blanche and Peter, son and heir of King Alfonso XI of Castile. Nevertheless, it was almost immediately abandoned by the Castilian court in favor of a marriage with Joan, daughter of King Edward III of England.

Queenship
On 29 January 1350 at Brie-Comte-Robert, Blanche married King Philip VI of France, forty years her senior. Initially, she was intended to marry John, Duke of Normandy, heir of the throne of France, but, being considered as one of the most beautiful princesses of her time — which explains her nickname "Beautiful Wisdom"—  King Philip VI became captivated by her beauty and decided to marry her, while the Duke of Normandy was married with Blanche's first cousin Joan I, Countess of Auvergne. As the chronicler Jean Le Bel recounts:

Due to the Black Death that spread throughout the kingdom, the new Queen of France was not crowned after the wedding ceremony. Blanche's union with King Philip VI only lasted six months, when he suddenly died on 22 August 1350, due to exhaustion from constantly fulfilling his conjugal duties, according to some chroniclers. Pregnant by her late husband, Blanche gave birth nine months later, in May 1351, to a daughter named Joan. 

Since the announcement of the death of King Philip VI, Pope Clement VI considered the remarriage of Blanche with her former fiance, King Peter of Castile, to strengthen the links between the Kingdoms of Castile and France. After discussing it with Gil Álvarez Carrillo de Albornoz, Archbishop of Toledo, and Pedro, Archbishop of Santiago de Compostela, the Pope wrote on this subject on 5 October 1350 to Blanche's brother, King Charles II of Navarre, who had encouraged her marriage to Philip VI a few months before. The marriage plan was temporarily put on hold due to Blanche's pregnancy, but the Pope insisted after she gave birth. However, she refused to consider a second marriage and is said to have even declared, "The Queens of France do not remarry". Tenacious, the pontiff wrote in March 1352 to Joan of Évreux —Blanche's paternal aunt and also Dowager Queen of France— in order to make her change her mind, but the widow of Philip VI resolutely rejected the papal proposal.

Retirement
Once widowed, Blanche retired to the residence of Neaufles-Saint-Martin, located near Gisors, which her husband had granted her as her dower land. She devoted herself to the education of her daughter Joan, whose marriage contract with Infante John, Duke of Girona, son and heir of King Peter IV of Aragon, was signed on 16 July 1370; unfortunately, the princess died on 16 September 1371 in Béziers on her way to Perpignan to celebrate her wedding. Blanche's retirement did not prevent her from temporarily returning to the court of King John II, whom she tried to bring closer to her brother King Charles II of Navarre. Thus, after the assassination of Charles de la Cerda on 8 January 1354, she persuaded the French monarch to sign the Treaty of Mantes with the King of Navarre on 22 February of the same year.

The presence of Blanche was influential under the reign of King Charles VI of France. On 2 October 1380, she attended the proclamation of the end of the regency of the young sovereign at the Palais de la Cité, and on 18 July 1385, she welcomed his new wife Isabeau of Bavaria at Creil and was charged with teaching the new Queen the traditions and etiquette of the French court. On 22 August 1389, she organized the Joyous Entry of Queen Isabeau in Paris, which preceded her coronation the next day. During the coronation ceremony in Notre-Dame Cathedral in Paris, Blanche attended on Charles VI, along with her cousin Princess Blanche of France, Duchess of Orleans, youngest daughter of King Charles IV of France and Joan of Évreux. After this ceremony, Blanche withdrew to Neaufles-Saint-Martin and died on 5 October 1398, aged 67. She was buried in the royal necropolis at the Basilica of Saint-Denis next to her daughter. Her tomb, like many other royal ones, was desecrated on 17 October 1793 by the revolutionaries.

In Literature
Blanche de Navarre is a minor character in the historical series "The Accursed Kings" by Maurice Druon. She appears in the seventh and final volume, titled When a King loses France. The author describes it as follows:

References

Bibliography

General

Biographical studies

Testament patronage and material culture
  
 First publication: 
  — About the founding by Blanche de Navarre of a funeral chapel in the abbey church at the Basilica of St Denis.

External links

 

|-

1331 births
1398 deaths
Navarrese infantas
House of Évreux
French queens consort
14th-century French women 
14th-century French people 
Burials at the Basilica of Saint-Denis
Daughters of kings